Pagan Pride is a movement among American pagans to build a positive public image of paganism. Local Pagan Pride groups sponsor "Pagan Pride Day" festivals, usually in public locations such as city parks or university campuses. The first recorded reference to "Pagan Pride" can be traced to 1992.

The Pagan Pride Project
The Pagan Pride Project is an organization whose aims are to promote understanding of paganism, support various charities, and bring pagan communities closer together. The project's logo shows various pagan symbols encircling the Earth—the yin/yang symbol, Celtic cross, Mjöllnir, a Triple Goddess symbol, an Eye of Horus, Venus of Willendorf, ankh, pentagram, triskelion, Stone Megalith, Green Man, Enneagram, and the Kabbalistic Tree of life.

Pagan Pride Day
Pagan Pride Day is an annual event held in a variety of locations across the world. The festivities are as varied as the communities who organize them. Some events are simple open picnics or cook-outs held in a local park; others are full-fledged festivals with rented venues, performance stages, and food facilities. There are, however, several common elements.

First and foremost is the goal of educating the public about the beliefs and practices of various Neopagan traditions. The general public is invited and there are usually tables of reading materials, staffed by members of a range of Neopagan denominations. Speakers or workshops may focus on dispelling common misconceptions about Neopaganism, or may seek to educate outsiders about the details of their particular beliefs and practices.

The second most common aspect is charitable work. Many Pagan Pride coordinating committees choose a local charity to support with fundraising and/or donations raised by the event. These charities might be organizations related to environmental conservation, animal rescues, food pantries, shelters for victims of domestic violence, or related causes.

Pagan Pride Day events are open to the public and generally welcoming to families and children. Hosting a PPD event requires adherence to a range of policies.

Many Pagan Pride festivals showcase local Neopagan performers, artisans, and merchants. Some events offer open mic sessions where attendees might chant, tell jokes, spin tales, drum, or read poetry.

References

External links 
 Pagan Pride Project
 Houston Pagan Pride Day
 Kansas City Pagan Pride Day
 Italian Pagan Pride Day
 Los Angeles Pagan Pride
 Central New York Pagan Pride
New York City Pagan Pride Project
 Chicago Pagan Pride
 San Francisco Bay Area Pagan Pride
 Sacramento Pagan Pride
 Phoenix Pagan Pride
 San Diego Pagan Pride Day
 Louisville KY Pagan Pride 
  Nashville TN Pagan Pride 
 New Orleans Pagan Pride
 Indianapolis Pagan Pride Day
 Savannah GA Pagan Pride Day
 San Antonio TX Pagan Pride Day
 Salt Lake City Pagan Pride
 South Jersey Pagan Pride
 Central Arkansas Pagan Pride Day
 Nanaimo Pagan Pride Day
 Pagan Pride Raleigh
 Rhode Island Pagan Pride Day
 Roanoke Pagan Pride Day
 Cleveland Pagan Pride
News coverage
 200 gather in South Park for Pagan Pride Day - Post-Gazette coverage of event in Pittsburgh, PA
 Pagan pride day - Minneapolis / St. Paul event
 Savannah, GA Pagan Pride Day Pagan Pride in Savannah, GA
  Nanaimo BC, Canada Event
  Nanaimo BC, Canada Event
  Nanaimo BC, Canada Event
 Kansas City Pagan Pride Day 2013 Event

Modern paganism in the United States
Modern pagan events
1990s in modern paganism